The Anjana Chaudhari—also known as Anjana Chaudhary or Anjana Jat — is a Hindu Jat Caste.
Anjana Chaudhary mainly found in the Gujarat, Rajasthan, Himachal Pradesh and Madhya Pradesh states of India.

History
Muhnot Nainsi, in his khyat and vigat, reported the existence of "Anjana Jat" in a large number of villages of Merta City. In the caste-census of 1891, they are reported to have taken their caste-title or nomenclature from their home village. This statement makes sense of the evidence of the vagat. The Jat immigrants from Nagaur presumably derived their caste-title from the name of that village.

Clan list
The Jat community residing in Gujarat is called Anjana Jat or Anjana Chaudhari.  The Chaudharis of Gujarat are also known as Anjana.  The Clans (gotras) of many Chaudharis of Gujarat are similar to those of the Jats of North India. In Rajasthan, the Anjana are divided into two broad territorial divisions: the Malvi and Gujarati. The Malvi Anjana are further divided into a number of exogamous clans such as the Bag, Bhuria, Dangi, Edit, Fak, Gardiya, Hun, Judar, Kag, Kawa, Kharon, Kondli, Kukal, Kuva, Logar, Mewar, Munji, Odh, Shih, Tarak, Vagada, and United. The Anjana speak the Malvi dialect of Rajasthani.

Kuldevi
The Kuldevi (ancestral tutelary deity) of the Anjana Chaudhari is Maa Arbuda. The main temple is located at Mount Abu, Rajasthan. In Gujarat, the main temples are located in Mehsana and Leba-bhema ni vavo Village, Mahisagar district. Katyayani maa may also be worshiped.

See also
 Jat people
 Kunbi
 Kurmi

References

Further reading

Social groups of Gujarat
Social groups of Rajasthan
Social groups of Madhya Pradesh
Jat clans
Jat
Indian castes